Monolithic system can have different meanings in the contexts of computer software and hardware.

In software
A software system is called "monolithic" if it has a monolithic architecture, in which functionally distinguishable aspects (for example data input and output, data processing, error handling, and the user interface) are all interwoven, rather than containing architecturally separate components.

In hardware
An electronic hardware system, such as a multi-core processor, is called "monolithic" if its components are integrated together in a single integrated circuit. Note that such a system may consist of architecturally separate componentsin a multi-core system, each core forms a separate componentas long as they are realized on a single die.

References

See also 
 Monolithic application

Software architecture